The First Stage, or the Preliminary Phase, of the 2009 Copa Sudamericana de Clubes was the first round of the tournament. It was contested by 30 teams in 15 two-legged ties. The winners of each tie advanced to the Second Stage (also known as the Round of 16).

Matches
The first stage began on August 4, and ended on September 17. Team #1 played the first leg at home.

|}

Qualifier O1

Goiás advances 6–5 on penalties.

Qualifier O2

Unión Española advances 4–1 on points.

Qualifier O3

Vitória and Coritiba tied on points (3 each), goal difference (0 each), and away goals (0 each). Vitória advances 5–3 on penalties.

Qualifier O4

Universidad de Chile advances 6–0 on points.

Qualifier O5

Fluminense advances on away goals.

Qualifier O6

Cienciano advances 4–1 on points.

Qualifier O7

Lanús advances 6–0 on points.

Qualifier O8

Emelec advances 6–0 on points.

Qualifier O9

Botafogo advances 4–1 on points.

Qualifier O10

LDU Quito advances 4–1 on points.

Qualifier O11

San Lorenzo advances on away goals.

Qualifier O12

Alianza Atlético advances 4–1 on points.

Qualifier O13
Bye for the defending champion Internacional.

Qualifier O14

River Plate advances 6–0 on points.

Qualifier O15

Vélez Sarsfield advances 4–1 on points.

Qualifier O16

Cerro Porteño advances 6–0 on points.

Notes
1.The match was suspended in the 66th minute after a fan rushed the field and attacked a River Plate player. At the time, River Plate was ahead 1–0. CONMEBOL punished Blooming by changing the results to 3–0 and fining the club $10,000.
2.The match report erroneously places Gabriel Paletta's own goal in the 33rd minute of the first half. In actuality, the own goal occurred in the second half of the game at around the 78th minute mark. The mistake could be due to referee error since the 78th minute of the match is the 33rd minute of the second half.

References

External links
First Stage schedule

First Stage